Saúl Cofiño (born 12 July 1978) is a Spanish gymnast. He competed at the 2000 Summer Olympics.

References

External links
 

1978 births
Living people
Spanish male artistic gymnasts
Olympic gymnasts of Spain
Gymnasts at the 2000 Summer Olympics
Gymnasts from Barcelona